Christine Smith-Collins (born September 9, 1969 in Darien, Connecticut) is an American rower. Prior to her rowing for team USA, Collins rowed for the Trinity College women's crew team.

References

Bibliography

External links
 

1969 births
Living people
Rowers at the 2000 Summer Olympics
Olympic bronze medalists for the United States in rowing
American female rowers
World Rowing Championships medalists for the United States
Medalists at the 2000 Summer Olympics
21st-century American women
Pan American Games medalists in rowing
Pan American Games gold medalists for the United States
Medalists at the 1995 Pan American Games
Rowers at the 1995 Pan American Games